The Şamşud gas field is a natural gas field located in Șamșud, Sălaj County. It was discovered in 1915 and developed by and Romgaz. It began production in 1920 and produces natural gas and condensates. The total proven reserves of the Şamşud gas field are around 52 billion cubic feet (1.5 km³), and production is slated to be around 5.3 million cubic feet/day (0.67×105m³) in 2010.

References

Natural gas fields in Romania